Frederik Albertus Spies (born 8 February 1985 in Odendaalsrus, South Africa) is a South African rugby union footballer. His regular playing position is lock.

Rugby career

He was a member of the Pumas side that won the Vodacom Cup for the first time in 2015, beating  24–7 in the final. Spies made three appearances during the season, scoring one try.

References

External links

itsrugby.co.uk profile

Living people
1985 births
South African rugby union players
Rugby union locks
Griquas (rugby union) players
Golden Lions players
Boland Cavaliers players
Pumas (Currie Cup) players
Afrikaner people
University of the Free State alumni
Rugby union players from the Free State (province)